Mamulique is an extinct Pakawan language of Nuevo León, Mexico.

Called Carrizo (Carrizo de Mamulique) by Jean-Louis Berlandier, it was recorded in a twenty-two-word vocabulary (in two versions) from near Mamulique, Nuevo León in 1828 (Berlandier et al. 1828–1829, 1850: 68–71). These speakers were a group of about forty-five families who were all Spanish-speaking Christians.

Example phrase
Goddard (1979: 384), citing Berlandier, provides the following phrase for Mamulique, with aha meaning 'water'.

aha mojo cuejemad (original transcription)
aha moxo kwexemat (IPA approximation)
Donne moi de l'eau. (French glossing)
Give me water. (English glossing)

References

Sources
 Berlandier, Jean L.; & Chowell, Rafael (1828–1829). [Vocabularies of languages of south Texas and the lower Rio Grande]. (Additional manuscripts, no. 38720, in the British Library, London.)
 Berlandier, Jean L.; & Chowell, Rafael (1850). Luis Berlandier and Rafael Chovell. Diario de viage de la Commission de Limites. Mexico.

Pakawan languages
Comecrudan languages
Extinct languages of North America